The Harbaqa Dam or Kharbaqa Dam was a Roman era Palmyrene gravity dam in the Syrian desert about  southwest from Palmyra on the road to Damascus. The dam, built of rubble, concrete, and dressed with ashlar stones, dates to the first or second century AD. The dam later was used as a water supply for the Umayyad palace of Qasr al-Hayr al-Gharbi.

Overview
The dam was built in the first/second-century AD by Palmyra. It was restored and used again by the Umayyads in the eighth century for irrigation purposes. It served as a major water supply for the nearby Qasr al-Hayr al-Gharbi, to which it was connected by a canal. The dam collected the seasonal floods of Wadi al-Barada in a storage basin that could be used all year. The remains of the dam are well-preserved for lack of quarrying from nearby settlements.

The dam was built out of a concrete core faced on both air and water face with ashlar stones. The dam wall had three outlets. Two outlets were located at the base that allow the torrential water to flow in winter.

The dam was first surveyed in 1934 by Antoine Poidebard. A more detailed survey and excavation was conducted by a French archaeological team led by Daniel Schlumberger in 1938.

See also 
 List of Roman dams and reservoirs
 Roman architecture
 Roman engineering

References

Bibliography 

Dams in Syria
Ancient Roman dams
Gravity dams
Buildings and structures in Homs Governorate